In mathematics, the notion of polyconvexity is a generalization of the notion of convexity for functions defined on spaces of matrices. Let Mm×n(K) denote the space of all m × n matrices over the field K, which may be either the real numbers R, or the complex numbers C. A function f : Mm×n(K) → R ∪ {±∞} is said to be polyconvex if

can be written as a convex function of the p × p subdeterminants of A, for 1 ≤ p ≤ min{m, n}.

Polyconvexity is a weaker property than convexity. For example, the function f given by

is polyconvex but not convex.

References

  (Definition 10.25)

Convex analysis
Matrices
Types of functions